Chahar Biti (also Romanized as Chahār Bītī; also known as Chahār Bīd, Chahār Bīdī, Charta Bīt, Kahīr, and Kahīr-e Chenār Bīd) is a village in Kahir Rural District, in the Central District of Konarak County, Sistan and Baluchestan Province, Iran. At the 2006 census, its population was 333, in 62 families.

References 

Populated places in Konarak County